Scamp (Scamp Sailing Team) is a Polish sailing team.

In 2019 they won bronze medal during ORC European Championships in Oxelösund.

Establishment and history 
Team was formed in 2015 by Maciej Gnatowski and Witold Karałow. Until 2017 the team was training on the yacht Scamp One, manufactured by American company Reichel/Pugh. During 2017/2018 and 2018/2019 seasons the team trained on Scamp 27 (class Soto 40). In 2020 a new yacht was bought by Scamp team, Scamp 3 (class HH42) manufactured by Hudson Yacht Group.

The team currently holds a record time on route Gdynia–Gotland–Gdynia (Scamp 3).

For 2021/22 season, the team plans to participate in Europe's and world's major races.

Awards 
Scamp Sailing Team has won many awards presented on Polish waters. Among them are:
 Bronze medal during ORC European Championships in Oxelösund 2019
 Bursztynowy Puchar Neptuna 2019
 Lotos Nord Cup 2019

Team members 
2020/2021 season crew:

 Jakub Marciniak – captain and tactician
 Grzegorz Goździk – bosman and foreman
 Mikołaj Gielniak – mastman
 Piotr Obidziński – mastman
 Andrzej Grabowski – pitman
 Maciej Ślusarek – front sail trimmer
 Kuba Jankowski – front sail trimmer
 Maciej Gnatowski – back sail trimmer
 Andrzej Brochocki – running backstay
 Mateusz Zieniewicz – running backstay
 Witold Karałow – skipper
 Bogusław Gnatowski – team senior

References

External links 

 Official website

Sailing teams